Jiwani (Urdu) is a town and commercial port that is located along the Gulf of Oman in the Gwadar District of the Balochistan province in Pakistan. The town is also next to the Iran-Pakistan border. The town has a total population of 25,000 and is expected to become a major commercial centre in concert with the development of the port city of Gwadar.

Overview

Jiwani is located between Gwadar and Chabahar at the eastern end of the Gwadar Bay. The area around the bay includes an important mangrove forest extending across the international border, and is an important habitat for a wide variety of wildlife, especially the endangered olive ridley and green turtles. Plans to grant fishing concessions and offshore drilling rights are potentially a threat to the wildlife of the area. The population largely depends upon fishing. There are a number of export oriented fish freezing plants located in Jiwani.

Jiwani holds strategic importance in the region, located immediately adjacent to the shipping lanes to and from the Persian Gulf. This is the main reason that the town hosts a small naval base and an airport with a  runway.

Jiwani was used during World War II as an allied airfield and the remains of some airfields are still available. Visiting the accommodation area of the airfield base used during World War II in Jiwani reveals many handwritten small stories and names of allied pilots. There is a water system which is now abandoned for use but is a marvel of civil works for meeting water requirements of the station. It used to store rain water in three stages in order to clean the water using its usual flow.

The Makran Coastal Highway now reaches Jiwani from Gwadar and also connects to Karachi.

Jiwani Military Base
According to media reports, Pakistan and China plan to build a military base in Jiwani.

Climate

Jiwani has a hot desert climate (Köppen climate classification BWh) with hot and humid but dry summers and warm winters. Most rainfall falls in winter, although there is sometimes a little rain in the monsoon season (July–August) as well.

See also 
 Jiwani Airport
 Jiwani Coastal Wetland
 Pishukan, a coastal town to the east of Jiwani.

References

Coastal cities and towns in Pakistan
Populated places in Gwadar District
Tehsils of Balochistan, Pakistan